The 2010–11 Hong Kong FA Cup was the 37th season of Hong Kong FA Cup and was played as a knockout competition for all Hong Kong First Division League teams in the 2010–11 season. The first matches were played on 27 February 2011, and the final was played on 29 May 2011.

Calendar

Bracket

First round

Quarter-finals

Semi-final

Final

Scorers
The scorers in the 2010–11 Hong Kong FA Cup are as follows:

4 goals
 Itaparica (TSW Pegasus)

3 goals
 Cahê (Citizen)
 Christian Annan (NT Realty Wofoo Tai Po)
 Godfred Karikari (TSW Pegasus)

2 goals
 Mateja Kežman (South China)
 Clayton Michel Afonso (NT Realty Wofoo Tai Po)
 Chen Liming (NT Realty Wofoo Tai Po)
 Ye Jia (NT Realty Wofoo Tai Po)

1 goal
 Chan Siu Ki (South China)
 Xu Deshuai (South China)
 Li Haiqiang (South China)

 Chan Wai Ho (South China)
 Kwok Kin Pong (South China)
 Giovane (South China)
 Paulinho Piracicaba (Citizen)
 Lam Ka Wai (Kitchee)
 Leung Kwok Wai (Tuen Mun)
 Lai Yiu Cheong (TSW Pegasus)
 Lee Hong Lim (TSW Pegasus)
 Mamadou Barry (Sun Hei)
 Wong Chun Yue (Sun Hei)
 Makhosonke Bhengu (Fourway Rangers)
 Li Jian (Fourway Rangers)
 Cheng King Ho (Tai Chung)

Own goal
 Iu Wai  (Fourway Rangers)

External links
FA Cup - Hong Kong Football Association

Fa Cup
Hong Kong Fa Cup
2011